Droppin' Things is a 1990 live album by the American jazz singer Betty Carter.

At the 32nd Grammy Awards, Carter's performance on this album was nominated for the Grammy Award for Best Jazz Vocal Performance, Female.

Droppin' Things peaked at 3 on the Billboard Top Jazz Albums chart.

Reception

In his review for AllMusic, Scott Yanow wrote that Droppin' Things "solidified her [Carter's] credentials as one of jazz's top singers", and described the music as "consistently stimulating".

Track listing
For the 1990 Verve CD Issue, 843991-2.
"30 Years" (Betty Carter) – 3:58
"Stardust"/"Memories of You" (Hoagy Carmichael, Mitchell Parish)/(Eubie Blake, Andy Razaf) – 12:37
"What's the Use of Wond'rin'?" (Oscar Hammerstein II, Richard Rodgers) – 5:22
"Open the Door '90" (Carter) – 5:20
"Droppin' Things" (Carter) – 6:34
"I Love Music" (Emile Boyd, Hal Smith) – 7:40
"Why Him?" (Burton Lane, Alan Jay Lerner) – 7:50
"Dull Day (In Chicago)" (Carter) – 12:13

Personnel
Performance
 Betty Carter - vocals, producer
 Geri Allen - piano
 Marc Cary - piano
 Craig Handy - tenor saxophone
 Freddie Hubbard - trumpet
 Tarus Mateen - double bass
 Gregory Hutchinson - drums
Production
 Chris Thompson - art direction
 Joe Ferla - engineer, mixing, recording
Joe Newland - digital editor
Ed Korengo, Dave Parla, David Merrill - assistant engineer
 Rich Cook - liner notes
 Susan Ragan, Courtney Brown Jr. - photography
 Ora Ross Harris - project coordinator
 Shelia Mathis - product manager
 David Lau - design
Kooster McAlister, Paul Prestopino - Record Plant remote

References

 

1990 live albums
Albums produced by Betty Carter
Albums recorded at the Bottom Line
Betty Carter live albums
Verve Records live albums